The Russo-Georgian War broke out in August 2008 and involved Georgia, Russian Federation, South Ossetia and Abkhazia.

Background 
Events prior to August 2008 are described in 2008 Russo-Georgian diplomatic crisis.

Tensions began escalating in 2008 since Kosovo declared its independence, but the definitive trigger was a bombing on the road near Tskhinvali on 1 August, which injured five Georgian policemen. This provocation allegedly was prepared in advance.

A chain of reactions and counter-reactions followed.

Overview timeline 
 August 1 - The explosion on the road near Tskhinvali, which had been probably engineered by South Ossetian separatists, injured five Georgian policemen. That night, intense fighting erupted between Georgians and the South Ossetian separatists. The casualties were six Ossetian militiamen killed.
 August 7 - At 19:00, President of Georgia Mikheil Saakashvili announced on television a unilateral ceasefire. He asked the South Ossetians to cease fire. After this, attacks became intense against the Georgian villages.
 August 8 - After returning fire, Georgian troops advanced towards the capital of the self-proclaimed Republic of South Ossetia, Tskhinvali, during the night. President Saakashvili later stated that Russia had already sent tanks to South Ossetia before he gave the order for Georgian forces to launch a military operation. Several hours after Georgian troops had assaulted Tskhinvali, Russia attacked Georgia, claiming to be conducting "peace enforcement" operation to defend peacekeepers and civilians. Russian military captured Tskhinvali in five days and expelled Georgian forces. Russia also launched airstrikes against military infrastructure in Georgia. Russia justified its actions by Georgia's "aggression" and perpetration of "genocide" in South Ossetia.
 August 9 - A second front was opened by the military of the separatist Republic of Abkhazia in the Kodori Valley, the only region of Abkhazia effectively controlled by Georgia.
 August 10 - The withdrawal of most Georgian troops from South Ossetia was announced by Georgia. According to the Russian Ministry of Defence, a naval confrontation between the Russian warships and several Georgian ships took place.
 August 11 - Russian forces deployed in Abkhazia advanced into western Georgia. A second front in western Georgia was opened. Russians captured the military base near the town of Senaki.
 August 12 - Russian President Medvedev said that he had ordered an end to military operations in Georgia. However, Russian air raids did not stop in Georgia. Russian troops drove through Poti and took up positions around it. After an end to hostilities was announced, Gori was shelled by artillery for the first time. A fragmentation shell exploded at a press center, which killed a Dutch journalist and also damaged the neighbouring buildings and lone open shop. Abkhaz forces captured the Kodori Valley, from which Georgian military and civilians had fled. French President Nicolas Sarkozy mediated a ceasefire plan between Russia and Georgia, which included provision to withdraw all troops to the lines they held before the war broke out.
 August 13 - Parts of Gori, a strategic central Georgian city, was occupied by a Russian tank battalion several hours after the ceasefire agreement.
That day, United States Secretary of State Condoleezza Rice traveled to Tbilisi, where Saakashvili signed the peace plan in her presence.
 August 19 - Russian forces took twenty-one Georgian soldiers prisoner and grabbed five US Humvees in Poti, taking them to a military base occupied by Russian troops in Senaki. Prisoners of war were exchanged by Russia and Georgia that day.
 August 22 - Russia had withdrawn most troops from Georgia by the evening to Abkhazia and South Ossetia and Georgia's main east-west highway was effectively reopened.
 August 26 - Russian President Medvedev signed decrees recognizing the Republic of Abkhazia and the Republic of South Ossetia as sovereign independent states.

Detailed timeline

August 1 – August 6 
A Georgian police car was blown up at 08:05 on the Eredvi-Kheiti road. Joint Peacekeeping Forces (JPKF) commander's media assistant Captain Vladimir Ivanov reported that JPKF military observers from all three sides and OSCE representatives investigated a bomb attack. The explosion, which had been probably engineered by South Ossetian separatists, injured five Georgian policemen. 122 mm artillery shells had been used to make the bombs, according to Russian peacekeepers.

According to the Russian peacekeepers, a Georgian sniper from near to the village of Prisi killed one South Ossetian militia member at about 18:17. South Ossetian de facto leader Eduard Kokoity claimed late that day that a "sniper war" was being conducted by Georgia and accused Ukraine and the United States of being responsible for this.

Ossetian separatists began shelling Georgian villages on 1 August at the earliest, with a sporadic response from Georgian peacekeepers and other troops in the region. During the night of 1/2 August, the worst outbreak of violence in the past four years happened. South Ossetia accused Georgia of firing first. South Ossetian authorities reported that the number of killed Ossetians was six (including one North Ossetian peacekeeper), and the number of injured was fifteen. Georgian Interior Ministry stated that the Georgian villages of Zemo Nikozi, Kvemo Nikozi, Nuli and Ergneti were shelled. The Georgian casualties were six injured civilians and one injured policeman. Georgian defense ministry official Mamuka Kurashvili said that the Georgians only responded to the South Ossetian shelling and suspected that Russian peacekeepers were also involved in the shelling of the Georgian villages.

On 3 August, the Russian government said that the situation was becoming more and more dangerous. The South Ossetians began evacuation from probable war into Russia, which resulted in twenty bus-loads of refugees leaving the region on the first day. According to the United Nations High Commissioner for Refugees, 1,100 refugees arrived in North Ossetia by bus in early August. According to the former secretary of the Security Council of South Ossetia, Anatoly Barankevich, about 35,000 people were evacuated from South Ossetia.

It was reported on 3 August that five battalions of the Russian 58th Army were moved to the vicinity of Roki Tunnel in North Ossetia.

South Ossetian president Eduard Kokoity said on 4 August that about 300 volunteers had arrived from North Ossetia to help fight the Georgians, and thousands more were expected from the North Caucasus.

Georgian minister Temur Iakobashvili travelled to South Ossetia to propose direct talks. He was not let into Tskhinvali and the separatists refused to meet him. Iakobashvili met with the commander of the Joint Peacekeeping Forces, Marat Kulakhmetov and Georgian commander Mamuka Qurashvili at the Ergneti checkpoint. Iakobashvili earlier had told a Georgian newspaper that the Georgian government would begin direct talks with the South Ossetian separatists "without any conditions", but would only agree to "a solution founded upon respect for Georgia's territorial integrity."

On 5 August, Georgian authorities had organised a tour for journalists and diplomats to demonstrate the separatist-caused damage. Russian ambassador-at-large Yuri Popov declared that Russia would intervene on the side of South Ossetia. South Ossetian president Kokoity blamed Georgia of "attempting to spark a full-scale war". The South Ossetian presidential envoy to Moscow, Dmitry Medoyev, declared that volunteers were already arriving, primarily from North Ossetia, to South Ossetia. He said that the regions of North Caucasus and the Cossacks were ready to help South Ossetia. He claimed that Tskhinvali relied mostly on its own forces.

On 5 August, Russia, Georgia and South Ossetia agreed to hold negotiations on 7 August, with Georgian minister Temur Iakobashvili attending talks in Tskhinvali. However, Georgia still opposed to the format of the Joint Control Commission. The Georgian state minister for reintegration Temur Iakobashvili said that a meeting between him and Boris Chochiev was decided and chief Russian negotiator over South Ossetia, Yuri Popov, would be attending. However, later the South Ossetians denied any agreement for such meeting.

On 6 August, the South Ossetian Press and Information Committee reported that Boris Chochiev said that the South Ossetians had agreed to "a consultative meeting" in Tskhinvali on 7 August. However, later the South Ossetians refused to participate in bilateral talks, demanding a JCC session.

On 6 August, it was reported that the South Ossetian claim of having killed twenty-nine Georgian servicemen in the clashes in the past week was not proven.

August 7 

Nezavisimaya Gazeta (NG) reported that events in South Ossetia could only be assessed as war. Starting with the night of 6–7 August, there was continuous fire. At 6 AM on the morning of 7 August, firing resumed. A reporter concluded that assault rifles, heavy artillery and grenade launchers were used. Tskhinvali hospital had been receiving the wounded all night. According to the Tskhinvali hospital, they received 14 wounded people. Anatoly Barankevich, the secretary of the Security Council of South Ossetia, claimed that the clashes began when the Georgians unsuccessfully attempted to seize a key height near the village Nuli on 6 August. According to Barankevich, Georgian special troops from the ministry of defense attempted to capture the Prisi Heights on the morning of 7 August. The hotel administrator in Tskhinvali refused to accept payment from a NG reporter, saying, "Maybe, here something will happen, that you will have to leave prematurely. So the bank won't work, and we won't be able to refund your money." JPKF commander's assistant Vladimir Ivanov told NG that the peacekeepers had documented five illegal overflights of the Georgian Su-25 jets from the Gori district towards Java and three drones during the night of 6–7 August. Nezavisimaya Gazeta also reported that Russian troops were being pulled towards the Georgian border, however Russian military claimed that they continued their exercises.

According to the phone calls intercepted by the Georgian intelligence, regular (non-peacekeeping) Russian military entered South Ossetia in the early hours of 7 August through the Roki Tunnel. Later that day, even the state-controlled Russian TV showed Abkhazia's de facto president Sergei Bagapsh, who said at a meeting of the Abkhaz National Security Council: "I have spoken to the president of South Ossetia. It has more or less stabilized now. A battalion from the North Caucasus District has entered the area."

Although South Ossetian separatists initially said in the morning that six people were wounded after fire exchange during the night and morning, later they said that the casualties were increased to eighteen. The Georgian Interior Ministry said the Georgian villages of Eredvi, Prisi, Avnevi, Dvani and Nuli were shelled on late 6 August and two Georgian peacekeepers were wounded. The South Ossetians claimed that fire recommenced at about 10. According to Russia Today, after Russian peacekeepers intervened in the conflict, fire exchange stopped for 40 minutes. South Ossetian de facto president Kokoity said that "South Ossetia stopped shooting for 40 minutes".

Around 14:00, the South Ossetians renewed their shelling and killed two Georgian peacekeepers in Avnevi. According to Georgian Prime Minister Lado Gurgenidze, these were the first Georgian deaths in South Ossetia since the nineties.

At about 14:30, Georgian tanks, 122 mm howitzers and 203 mm self-propelled artillery began heading towards South Ossetia to dissuade separatists from additional attacks. According to The Washington Post, Georgian infantry left their bases in late afternoon and began moving toward South Ossetia. During the afternoon, OSCE monitors recorded Georgian military traffic, including artillery, on roads near Gori. In the afternoon, Georgian personnel left the Joint Peacekeeping Force headquarters in Tskhinvali.

Georgian official said that South Ossetian militia blew up an APC by a rocket propelled grenade and three Georgian peacekeepers were wounded.

Temur Iakobashvili had refused any talks in the Joint Control Commission (JCC) format, since the commission "is responsible for what is happening in the region," adding if Russian "puppets" would not be forced to negotiate then Russia's status as a mediator would be "in doubt." A Russian co-chairman of the JCC, Yury Popov, said in Tbilisi he was going to visit Tskhinvali with Iakobashvili: "We have not yet arranged a trip to Tskhinvali...The negotiations will be held if the situation allows it." South Ossetian leader Eduard Kokoity had earlier warned Popov that his visit to Tskhinvali would be "dangerous". Georgian Foreign Ministry issued a statement calling on Russia to force the separatists to stop the systematic shelling and saying, "Responsibility for the latest events lies with Russia." The Georgian diplomats said that mercenaries and military hardware were moving to South Ossetia through the Roki Tunnel. In the afternoon South Ossetia claimed that lots of Georgian troops were advancing towards them. Abkhaz Defense Minister Mirab Kishmaria had said earlier: "The Abkhazian Security Council held a meeting [earlier] today, where our republic's Commander-in-Chief Sergei Bagapsh gave me instructions to put our troops on combat readiness."

At 16:00, Temur Iakobashvili arrived in Tskhinvali for a previously-arranged meeting with South Ossetians and Russian diplomat Yuri Popov; however, Russia's special envoy, who blamed a flat tire, did not appear; and neither did the Ossetians. Temur Iakobashvili met with General Marat Kulakhmetov (the Russian commander of the Joint Peacekeeping Force), who said that Russian peacekeepers could not stop Ossetian attacks and Georgia should implement a ceasefire. "Nobody was in the streets – no cars, no people," Iakobashvili told journalists several days later.

According to Russia Today, by the evening four people were reported to have been killed and more than two dozen wounded. Later it was reported that about 12 people were killed and more than 20 injured on 7 August.

At 18:10, Russian peacekeepers told the OSCE monitors that Georgian artillery was fired on Khetagurovo. But independent verification of this report was impossible.

At around 19:00, Georgian President Saakashvili, ordered a unilateral ceasefire and no-response order. "A sniper war is ongoing against residents of villages [in the South Ossetian conflict zone] and as I speak now intense fire is ongoing from artillery, from tanks, from self-propelled artillery systems – which have been brought into the conflict zone illegally – and from other types of weaponry, including from mortars and grenade launchers," Saakashvili said in a live TV address at 19:10. Saakashvili called for negotiations "in any type of format," reaffirmed the offer of "unrestricted autonomy" for South Ossetia, proposed that Russia should become the guarantor of that solution, offered a general amnesty, and pleaded for international help to stop the hostilities. Ceasefire was announced after a skirmish that had killed up to ten Georgian peacekeepers and civilians, according to the Georgian authorities.

Russia regarded the ceasefire as an attempt to buy time to deploy Georgian forces for an offensive. The separatists shelled Tamarasheni and Prisi after Saakashvili's ceasefire. They destroyed Avnevi and a police station in Kurta (seat of the Provisional Administrative Entity of South Ossetia). The escalated attacks forced civilians to flee the Georgian villages. Georgian Interior Ministry official later told the Russian newspaper Kommersant (on 8 August) that after this, "it became clear" that South Ossetians wouldn't stop firing and the Georgian casualties were 10 killed and 50 wounded.

Georgian foreign minister Eka Tkeshelashvili called the Assistant Secretary of State of the United States, Daniel Fried. She told him that Russian tanks were moving towards South Ossetia, but Fried replied that war must be avoided.

Georgian forces returned fire after the separatist shelling. Mamuka Kurashvili, head of the Georgian peacekeeping operations, told journalists late on August 7 that the South Ossetian violation of a unilateral ceasefire forced Georgia "to restore constitutional order". Georgia said the operation against the separatists would establish a "durable peace". South Ossetian envoy to Moscow, Dmitry Medoyev called the ceasefire that was announced on 7 August a "smokescreen".

The United Nations Security Council meeting was organized on 7 August at 23:00 (US EST time) upon Russias's request. Georgia participated in a follow-up open meeting held at 01:15 (US EST time) on 8 August. A discussion for a press statement calling for an end to hostilities did not reach a consensus.

August 8 

Russian news report claims that around 00:53 MSK, Georgian forces were shelling the route along which refugees were fleeing from the city.

After the midnight, the Georgian government stated that "hundreds" of fighters and military hardware had passed through Roki Tunnel. In the early hours of the morning, President of North Ossetia–Alania, Taimuraz Mamsurov told the Interfax news agency that hundreds of armed "volunteers" from North Ossetia were heading to the battleground.

Eduard Kokoity said: "The enemy has suffered considerable losses from our forces. Our troops feel confident." Kakha Lomaia, the secretary of the Georgian National Security Council, said on the same day that Russian army units were moving towards the Roki tunnel.

At about 04:45 MSK, Georgian State Minister for Reintegration Temur Iakobashvili announced that Tskhinvali was nearly surrounded. He said that "we don't desire demolitions or victims, so we again offer the separatist leaders to begin direct talks over ceasefire and de-escalation of the situation in the conflict zone". While before 8 August, more than half of South Ossetian territory was controlled by the Georgian authorities, after capturing five South Ossetian villages Georgia was controlling two-thirds of the South Ossetian territory.

In the early morning, an unspecified number of Abkhaz troops were sent to the border of the  arms limitation zone between Abkhazia and Georgia proper after Abkhaz Security Council had decided so. However, high combat readiness was not yet announced.

According to Georgia, the Russian forces first entered South Ossetia at 05:30 on 8 August.

Interfax reported that by 6:00, Abkhazia began moving heavy weaponry and troops towards the Georgian border. President of North Ossetia–Alania, Taimuraz Mamsurov, claimed that a number of Sukhoi Su-25 aircraft of the Georgian Air Force attacked what he described to be a humanitarian aid convoy en route from Vladikavkaz. Mamsurov, who had accompanied the convoy, was unharmed.

Iakobashvili told Agence France-Presse that Georgian government did not wish "to assault Tskhinvali, but to neutralise separatist positions," and that Georgian troops had captured eight South Ossetian villages. A South Ossetian government website said Tskhinvali was being assaulted by the Georgian military. South Ossetian leader Eduard Kokoity had told Interfax that the Georgian attack on Tskhinvali was a "perfidious and vile" act. By the morning, the South Ossetian authorities had reported at least 15 civilians had been killed as a result of the Georgian shelling. The Georgian minister Temur Iakobashvili said that day that Georgia intended to eliminate "a criminal regime".

A Georgian TV station Imedi announced that Georgian military was in control of Tskhinvali at 08:25. Another Georgian TV, Rustavi-2 had reported that eight South Ossetian villages (among them Sarabuk, a strategic vantage point on high ground) had been secured by the Georgian forces.

The Permanent Representative of Russia to the United Nations Vitaly Churkin called an emergency meeting of the United Nations Security Council at 01:15 (US EST time) where an exchange of accounts was made with the Georgian ambassador. After the meeting, Churkin said that some of the council members would not agree to "the renunciation of the use of force". Churkin claimed he had warned the council about a "Georgian military buildup" in South Ossetia in the past days. He condemned Georgian rejection of the non-use of force against South Ossetia and Abkhazia.

Around 10:00, Georgia reported that three Russian Su-24 attack aircraft flew into the Georgian airspace. One Su-24 bombed the area near a police station of the town of Kareli and several civilians were wounded. Later that day, the source in the Russian Ministry of Defense told the Russian newspaper Kommersant, "the [Russian] planes attacked only military targets: military base in Gori, airfields in Vaziani and Marneuli, where [Georgian] Su-25 and L-39 airplanes are based, as well as the radar station 40 kilometres from Tbilisi". When asked why Russian warplanes entered Georgian airspace well before Russian government announced the involvement in the conflict, the officer responded, "As per order from our command."

On the morning of 8 August, Russian Prime Minister Vladimir Putin, who was in Beijing attending the 2008 Summer Olympics, condemned the Georgian government for "aggressive actions" and said he had spoken with American President George Bush and Chinese leaders. Putin threatened that Georgian "aggression" against the separatists would incur a Russian "response".

Georgian authorities stated that they began using aviation only after three Russian Su-24 planes had flown into the Georgian airspace at 11:00. According to Kommersant, Georgian official said that by that time Russian peacekeepers had not participated in the conflict.

It was reported that at about 11:30, four Russian aircraft intruded into Georgian airspace and dropped a bomb near the city of Gori with no casualties.

Shota Utiashvili, a spokesman for the Georgian Interior ministry, dismissed Russian media report that Georgians had entered Tskhinvali and said that Georgia wanted "to give time to the remaining civilians to leave Tskhinvali," adding "if the need arises", then Georgians would move in. Utiashvili said that Georgian troops were fighting against two Russian convoys of trucks moving towards Tskhinvali. Eduard Kokoity said: "We are in full control of the capital city. Fighting is on the city limits."

Russian peacekeepers had reported that several of them were killed or wounded after Georgian attack.

By 11:38, Saakashvili had announced the mobilisation of the Georgian reserve troops in the middle of what he referred to as a "large-scale military aggression" by Russia and called for Russia to stop bombardment of the Georgian towns. He also said: "A large part of Tskhinvali is now liberated and fighting is ongoing in the center of Tskhinvali." That day, Saakashvili said that two Russian military aircraft had been shot down by the Georgians. Later that day, it was reported by Georgia that four Russian warplanes were shot down and Georgians fought against two convoys of mercenaries from Russia.

Contradicting a Georgian report, the Russian Ministry of Defence denied that a Russian war plane had been shot down over the Georgian territory, calling it "informational provocation". RIA Novosti reported that day that the Russian diplomat Yuri Popov denied the Georgian reports of Russian bombings and called them "misinformation".

At 14:15 local time, Georgia announced that they offered a three-hour ceasefire to let civilians leave Tskhinvali. However, by 14:29 MSK, Marat Kulakhmetov, commander of the peacekeeping forces in the region, had said that "these are further lies from the Georgian side. No corridor for civilians has been opened." Georgia later said (on 9 August) that civilians did not manage to use the safe corridor during the three-hour ceasefire because of Russian bombing.

By 15:00 MSK, an emergency meeting of Security Council had been convened by Russian President Dmitry Medvedev and Russia's options regarding the conflict in South Ossetia had been discussed.

At about 15:00, Eduard Kokoity was meeting with the North Ossetian leader Taymuraz Mamsurov in Java. Mamsurov was followed by about one thousand volunteers, and one of the columns was bombed by the Georgian aviation. Java had been transformed into quite-well equipped fortification in the previous months. One Georgian diplomat told Kommersant that by capturing Tskhinvali they wanted to demonstrate that Georgia wouldn't tolerate killing of Georgian citizens and capturing Java was not their intention.

At around 16:00 local time, the Georgian Interior Ministry said that two bombs were dropped on the Vaziani Military Base near Tbilisi by a Russian aircraft without any casualties. The bombed site had housed the Russian army before they were forced to withdraw to Russia by the Georgian government before the war. The Daily Telegraph described this bombing as "Russia's revenge". On the same day, Russian authorities rejected the reports that its aircraft had entered Georgian airspace. The Daily Telegraph correspondent reported that he saw Russian jets near Tskhinvali, and the Georgian military also described the jets as Russian.

According to Kommersant, at around 16:00, it became known that two tank columns of the 58th Army passed the Roki Tunnel and Java and were on the road to Tskhinvali. The column had begun moving towards South Ossetia at the same time as President Medvedev was giving a televised speech. According to the official version, they were "aid for peacekeeping forces, who have suffered serious losses". According to Kommersant, the Russian units had been stationed near the South Ossetian border in Alagirsky District for the past few weeks. According to Kommersant, at around 17:00, Russian tanks columns bypassed Tskhinvali and began bombing the Georgian fortifications. The secretary of the Security Council of South Ossetia Anatoly Barankevich stated that the Georgians were leaving Tshvinvali.

After the opening ceremonies in Beijing, Russian Prime Minister Vladimir Putin told U.S. President George W. Bush that "a real war" had begun in South Ossetia, to which Bush reportedly replied that "no one wants war", and Putin added that "in Russia many volunteers intend to go there (in South Ossetia to fight) and undoubtedly, it is very difficult to maintain peace in the region".

Russian military commander Igor Konashenkov said that the number of killed Russian peacekeepers was more than 10 and about 30 were injured.

By the evening, a military airfield in Marneuli near Tbilisi was bombed by Russia. Three people were killed and another five wounded in the air strike in Marneuli.

Georgian Minister Iakobashvili said that Georgians fully controlled Tskhinvali. Russian Ground Forces spokesman Colonel Igor Konashenkov said that Russian tanks were firing on the Georgians in Tskhinvali.

A correspondent for the Russian TV First Channel had reported by 19:06 MSK that South Ossetian forces had recaptured the Zar road and a column of Russian tanks from the 58th Army was moving to Tskhinvali. Lenta.ru reported at 19:30 MSK, that the Georgian troops began to withdraw from Tskhinvali and that Georgia had temporarily ceased the artillery fire. The Russian commander of the Joint Peacekeeping Force Marat Kulakhmetov said that as a result of Georgian heavy bombardment, Tskhinvali was "almost totally destroyed". Earlier reports had said that objects of infrastructure, including gas pipes, and a hospital were destroyed.

It was reported by 19:33 MSK that Russian warplanes were bombing the Georgian troops in South Ossetia and at least five Georgian soldiers were wounded. Su-24 bombers and Su-27 fighters were reportedly in action and one of them reportedly had already been shot down. The Russian air force was in complete control of the airspace above Tskhinvali.

By 20:04 MSK, Agence France-Presse had reported that the National Security Council of Georgia (through a statement of Council Secretary Alexander Lomaia) declared that if messages about Russian tanks in South Ossetia were confirmed, then Georgia would declare war on Russia. According to Lenta.ru, there were reports that 150 Russian tanks were near Tskhinvali or had already entered the town. By 20:19 MSK, the Staff of the North Caucasus Military District said that Russian tanks had entered Tskhinvali. South Ossetia claimed that Georgian aviation had continued to attack Tskhinvali despite the promised ceasefire until 18:00. Meanwhile, the Russian Defence Ministry stated that reinforcements were sent to South Ossetia to aid peacekeepers.

By 17:33 UK, Eduard Kokoity had been quoted as saying there were "hundreds of dead civilians" in Tskhinvali. Georgian Prime Minister Lado Gurgenidze said that day that Georgia moved in to restore peace in South Ossetia because the separatist attacks could no longer be tolerated.

Igor Konashenkov, Assistant Commander of the Russian Ground Forces, said that the units of the 58th Army were sent to aid peacekeepers and were near the entrance of Tskhinvali. Inal Pliev, the South Ossetian representative in the JCC, claimed that the fighting in Tskhinvali had killed several thousand civilians. President of South Ossetia, Eduard Kokoity, had arrived in Tskhinvali.

The Daily Telegraph reported, "As the Russian soldiers advanced, the gunfire and shelling in Tskhinvali once again intensified and it became apparent that the Georgians were in retreat." After the dark, South Ossetian forces claimed that most of the South Ossetian towns were recaptured by them.

Russian media reported heavy gunfire between Russian and Georgian troops resumed after several hours and Russian peacekeepers were battling the Georgian troops in the southern outskirts of Tskhinvali. The Russian peacekeeping forces in South Ossetia reported in the late evening that 12 Russian peacekeepers were killed and 150 were wounded.

Kakha Lomaia, the head of Georgia's Security Council, said that only 1,000 Georgian troops would be withdrawn from Iraq, telling Reuters, "We have already communicated to our American friends that we are going to withdraw half our contingent of soldiers in Iraq within days because we are under Russian aggression." According to the Georgian commander, the United States would transport the troops to Georgia and initially 1,000 troops would leave; U.S. officials only said that they were studying options for transportation.

One South Ossetian resident had told the Russian newspaper Kommersant that although there were rumours that "almost everyone" was evacuated from South Ossetia to Vladikavkaz, there seemed to be some civilians left in Tskhinvali.

August 9 

In New York, an emergency session of the United Nations Security Council was convened, where the ambassador of Georgia detailed the "premeditated military intervention" following Russia's "well-calculated provocation". The Georgian side also declared, "I can say with full responsibility that Georgian troops are not targeting peacekeepers. I want to stress that the Government’s actions were taken in self-defence after repeated armed provocations and with the sole goal of protecting the civilian population." The Russian ambassador responded that "Georgia is continuing its treacherous attack on South Ossetia." The United Nations once again failed to reach consensus on a course of action for a cessation of hostilities.

At around 21:03 GMT on 8 August, Kakha Lomaia reported that Russia had bombed the port of Poti on the Black Sea coast and Georgian President Saakashvili would declare martial law in several hours. It was alleged that bombing of Georgian civilian and economic infrastructure had been started. Later, the Georgian foreign ministry said on 9 August that Russian bombing "devastated" Poti. Meanwhile, Russia had cut off all air connections with Georgia.

During the night, Russian planes bombed the Senaki military base, killing 12 Georgian soldiers and wounding 14. One wounded soldier later died in the hospital. Railway station in Senaki was also bombed. Georgian Interior Ministry reported the Vaziani military base near Tbilisi was bombed, in addition two other Georgian military bases. After the Russian bombing, Georgian officials evacuated the governmental offices. The military base outside Gori was hit by bombing that day.

According to the Russian authorities, Tskhinvali was recaptured by the Russian troops during the morning. However, according to the Georgian officials, they voluntarily withdrew from Tskhinvali. Later, Russian TV reported that Georgia relaunched its attack from the South. According to Russian Colonel General Anatoly Nogovitsyn, 12 Russian soldiers were killed. That day, a Russian journalist, Zaid Tsarnayev told Reuters that Tskhinvali was badly damaged. According to the Russian Defence Ministry, in addition to 15 dead Russian peacekeepers, 70 Russian peacekeepers were wounded.

It was reported that Georgians had attacked a column of armored vehicles which was heading towards Tskhinvali, and wounded Lieutenant General Anatoly Khrulyov, the commander of Russian forces in South Ossetia. A Russian armored column was entering Tskhinvali when was ambushed by Georgian special forces. Russian Major Denis Vetchinov organized a defense, but was killed from the battle wounds.

At around 06:27 GMT, Reuters reported that two Russian fighters had bombed Georgian artillery encampments near Gori.

Russian President Dmitry Medvedev said that the Russian Federation began operation "to force the Georgian side to accept peace".

At 11:29 MSK, RIA Novosti reported that Russian paratroopers had been deployed to Tskhinvali. Russian military official Igor Konashenkov said that the paratroopers knew the area of the conflict well, since they had participated many times in exercises in North Ossetia. According to Igor Konashenkov, in addition to units of the 76th Airborne Division of the Russian Airborne Troops from Pskov, Ivanovo-based 98th Guards Airborne Division and Spetsnaz from the Moscow-based 45th Detached Reconnaissance Regiment would also be deployed to South Ossetia. That day, the Russian Ministry of Defence stated that the paratroopers entered Tskhinvali.

Russian military reported the death of 15 Russian peacekeepers; 150 peacekeepers had been wounded.

At around noon local time, Saakashvili said he proposed a ceasefire and the separation of the warring parties. Alexander Lomaia, secretary of Security Council, stated that this would mean Georgian military withdrawal from Tskhinvali and that Georgians would not respond to Russian shelling. Ambassador of Russia to NATO, Dmitry Rogozin, later that day said that Russia would start negotiations only if Georgian forces withdrew to the positions held before the hostilities.

At 05:25 EDT, Georgian President Saakashvili asked his country's parliament to announce a state of martial law in Georgia. The parliament approved the request, declaring martial law in Georgia for a duration of 15 days; David Bakradze, the Chairman of the Parliament of Georgia, said that Georgia actually was in a state of undeclared war with Russia. Bakradze called not to trust the Russian media. The order on "a state of war" gave President Saakashvili additional powers. Saakashvili on the afternoon called for the ceasefire and said, "We are dealing with absolutely criminal and crazy acts of irresponsible and reckless decision makers, which is on the ground producing dramatic and tragic consequences."

At around 15:57 MSK, Lenta.ru reported that the Russian Army General Vladimir Boldyrev had said that the 58th Army had fully cleared Tskhinvali of Georgian Armed Forces and that wounded peacekeepers and civilians were being evacuated. Alexander Lomaia, secretary of the Georgian National Security Council, stated that Georgian troops were fiercely battling with Russian troops in Tskhinvali on 9 August, who were conducting a full-scale military operation using tanks, armored vehicles, heavy artillery, soldiers and paratroopers. Lomaia said that the Russian planes were entering the Georgian airspace about every 15 minutes and that civilian and military targets were being bombed. According to Lomaia, Russia was using at least 50 warplanes.

After the United Nations peacekeepers had withdrawn from the Kodori Gorge, Georgian official said that 12 Russian jets were bombing the Georgian-controlled territory in Abkhazia. Aerial attacks were carried out by Abkhazia against the northern part of the Kodori Valley; the only part of Abkhazia effectively under Georgian control. Abkhaz foreign minister Sergei Shamba said Abkhazia acted because it had a treaty with South Ossetia and "Georgian forces in the Kodori Gorge posed a real threat." Georgian president Saakashvili said later that the attacks were repulsed. Georgian TV reported that the Russian planes were bombing the Kodori Gorge. Abkhaz foreign minister Sergei Shamba had said that operation against the gorge was launched and the Georgian forces would be expelled.

The Georgian government reported that 60 civilians were killed after residential buildings in Gori were hit by the bombs. According to the BBC, that day mostly military targets were bombed in Gori, which was used as supporting ground for the Georgian forces in South Ossetia. According to the Russian source, three bombs hit an armament depot and the façade of one of the adjacent 5-storey apartment buildings suffered as a result of exploding ammunition from the depot.

Vyacheslav Kovalenko, Russian ambassador to Georgia, said that 2,000 civilians of Tskhinvali and 13 Russian peacekeepers were killed. He claimed, "The city of Tskhinvali no longer exists. It is gone. The Georgian military has destroyed it." Georgian authorities stated that the Georgian casualties were 129 killed and 748 injured.

Vladimir Putin, after attending the Beijing Olympics, suddenly arrived in North Ossetia on 9 August to monitor a "humanitarian operation". Putin arrived in the evening and his meeting with the military was broadcast, demonstrating Putin's superiority over Medvedev. Putin said that dozens of South Ossetians were killed. He stated that Russia would no longer support Georgia's claim to the breakaway territory, "There is almost no way we can imagine a return to the status quo." Putin said that about 34,000 refugees from South Ossetia were registered so far. Putin said, "The actions of the Georgian powers in South Ossetia are, of course, a crime — first of all against their own people. The territorial integrity of Georgia has suffered a fatal blow." He said US$425 million for aid would be donated to South Ossetia by the Russian government. Putin's spokesperson claimed that the visit to Vladikavkaz had "no military component".

At 20:13 MSK, Lenta.ru reported that the Georgian government had stated to have downed 10 Russian jets. It was reported that Georgia had captured 3 pilots. However, the Russian General Staff had earlier confirmed the loss of two jets: Su-25 and Tu-22. Although Georgia had reported shootdown of 10 Russian planes, Russian Colonel General Anatoly Nogovitsyn only confirmed two hit Russian planes. Georgia claimed to have captured two Russian pilots. The downing of a Russian airplane and ejection of a pilot, whose bloody helmet was later shown by Georgian TV, had been witnessed by civilians in Gori that day.

According to a source in the Georgian government, the Roki Tunnel, used by Russians to bring in supplies and reinforcements, was demolished in the evening. The Russian Ministry of Defense denied the report. Time Magazine reporter John Wendle several days later confirmed that the tunnel had not been destroyed when he travelled to Tskhinvali from Russia.

Russia did not agree to cease hostilities at a third meeting of the UN Security Council on the crisis. "A ceasefire would not be a solution. The fighting is still going on. The Georgian forces are continuing to be on the South Ossetian territory," Vitaly Churkin said. On late 9 August, it was claimed by Russian military commanders that Georgian forces were expelled from Tskhinvali. This claim was rejected by Saakashvili. Dmitry Rogozin, Russian ambassador to NATO, claimed that "98 percent of Tskhinvali" was destroyed, adding, "Our troops have re-established control over the city." Georgian Deputy Interior Minister reported that about 40 Russian tanks around Tskhinvali were destroyed by Georgian forces.

The U.S. embassy in Georgia organized an evacuation convoy to leave for Yerevan on August 10 and scheduled a second one for August 11 and invited American citizens in the region to join them, while it also issued a travel warning. With coordination from embassy employees in Yerevan and the United States Marine embassy guards, the convoy's progress was followed and documented along their travel route. Embassy personnel in Yerevan made lodging arrangements for the evacuated family members and United States citizens coming from Georgia. The United States Marine embassy guards who stayed in Tbilisi along with the embassy's essential staff were in constant communication with the Marines in Yerevan, and the two posts served as a communications hub for embassy personnel in Tbilisi to talk to their family members. The two embassy posts were able to maintain constant communication and relay up-to-date information regarding the safety and well-being of all embassy personnel that remained behind to secure the embassy and vital classified material.

Georgian officials said that Baku–Tbilisi–Ceyhan pipeline was attacked by Russian planes that day, but was not damaged. At least five Georgian cities had been bombed by Russia by 9 August.

Georgian president Saakashvili had said in an interview on CNN, "We are willing to do cease-fire immediately providing the other side stops to shoot and to bomb." However, the Kremlin press office claimed that Russia did not receive any official offer of a cease-fire.

CNN described Russian deployment to South Ossetia on 9 August, "Dozens of columns of up to 40 exhaust-belching vehicles wound through long tunnels, crossed bridges and passed villages clinging to the steep mountain slopes." According to Associated Press, it was the entry of Russian tanks and bombing of Georgian town that escalated the conflict.

August 10 

Reuters reported that South Ossetian officials claimed that fighting on the southern outskirts of Tskhinvali had ended at about midnight. According to South Ossetia, 12 Georgian tanks were destroyed on the outskirts of Tskhinvali.

Alexander Lomaya, Secretary of National Security Council of Georgia, had said conflict began because Russia aimed to "thwart its neighbors’ movement toward Western society and Western values", adding "If the world is not able to stop Russia here, then Russian tanks and Russian paratroopers can appear in every European capital." Georgian officials admitted that Russian reaction surprised them. The New York Times stated that Russia "appeared determined to occupy both South Ossetia and Abkhazia." The New York Times reported that Georgian President Saakashvili had said that Georgia was in a state of war and Russia planned to occupy strategic economic infrastructure and to depose his government. However, when Anatoly Nogovitsyn, colonel general in the Russian Ministry of Defense, was asked whether Russia was in a state of war, he replied that was not the case. Georgian health minister had said that Georgian casualties were more than 80, 40 of which were civilians killed in the bombing of Gori. Georgian officials had said the conflict would end if the United States intervened, however they were counting on the Western diplomatic outcry to impact Russia.

After his visit to North Ossetia, Putin paid a visit to the Gorki residence near Moscow to meet Russian president Medvedev on early 10 August. There he called on the Prosecutor General's Office to investigate Georgian military action. Earlier in Vladikavkaz, Putin had named Georgian military action "complete genocide." Later that day, Medvedev stated, "There should be no doubt that the operation to force Georgia to peace will continue and the guilty ones will be brought to account." He ordered an investigation into acts of "genocide" committed by Georgia and suggested an international tribunal.
 
A ceasefire to begin at 05:00 was ordered by Georgian president Saakashvili.

The Georgian Interior Ministry stated that 6,000 Russian soldiers had entered Georgia by land and another 4,000 were moved by sea. Georgian Interior Ministry said before the dawn that military facilities near the civilian airport at Tbilisi were being bombed and people in Tbilisi could hear the explosions. The West had been earlier warned by Russia that the Black Sea fleet warships were sent to Ochamchire in Abkhazia. Georgian official reported that Russian warship from the Black Sea fleet barred a cargo ship from entering Poti, thus blockading the Georgian coast. Another Georgian official, Kakha Lomaia, stated that Russian jets simultaneously had bombed military and civilian targets in six locations. Lomaia stated that at least 55 Georgians were killed. Russian media claimed on 10 August that Russia was preparing to blockade the Georgian coast.

Georgia’s Internal Affairs Ministry spokesman, Shota Utiashvili, said that "Georgian troops have fully left South Ossetia", while according to Kakha Lomaia, Georgian troops "have relocated and assumed new positions." Russian peacekeeping force's spokesman Vladimir Ivanov, however, stated that "Georgia did not remove its forces from South Ossetia. Our observation posts have spotted Georgian law-enforcement units, as well as artillery and armoured vehicles." Utiashvili told the BBC that Georgians withdrew to positions of 6 August because of "humanitarian catastrophe". Although Georgia had said it had pulled out most its forces from South Ossetia, Russian officials stated that day that Georgia still had about 7,400 troops, 100 tanks and artillery in South Ossetia. It was reported that "Georgia's army of less than 25,000 men is confronting a Russian force which can count on more than one million troops." Colonel-General Anatoly Nogovitsyn of the Russian General Staff declared on the same day that "most of the city [Tskhinvali] is controlled by Russian peacekeeping forces." However, the fighting was still underway in Tskhinvali on late 10 August. Later that day, a dwindle in the fighting was reported by the South Ossetians.

President of Abkhazia Sergei Bagapsh said 1,000 troops were sent to the Kodori Valley. The mobilisation of reservists to reinforce positions was announced by him. He warned Abkhazia was ready to "enforce order" and would push further in case of Georgian resistance. That day, it was reported that separatist military was also concentrating on the border of Zugdidi Municipality. On the same day, Abkhaz president also accused Georgia of "genocide". That day, Russia was accused of having sent 150 tanks and 10 thousand troops to Abkhazia by Georgian president Saakashvili.

South Ossetian authorities had stated that 20 were killed and 150 wounded in Tskhinvali after overnight shelling. That day, Georgian Reintegration Minister Temur Iakobashvili said that the city of Zugdidi in western Georgia was being bombed.

The Foreign Ministry of Georgia announced readiness to negotiate a ceasefire and said that it had warned Russian diplomatic representative to Georgia. However, Russians claimed Georgian forces were not retreating, but merely regrouping. Georgian official stated that its forces were forced to retreat from South Ossetia. Russian Foreign Ministry confirmed receiving the offer, but said that "the Georgian side has not stopped military actions in South Ossetia, Georgian troops continued shelling." That day, the withdrawal of some Georgian troops was confirmed by deputy chief of the Russian General Staff, Colonel General Anatoliy Nogovitsyn. He said as many Russian troops would be sent to South Ossetia "as the situation may require," but they would not enter Georgia. Russian deputy Foreign Minister Grigory Karasin ruled out peace talks with Georgia until the latter withdrew from South Ossetia and signed a legally binding pact against the use of force against South Ossetia and Abkhazia.

Georgia and a Reuters witness reported that Tbilisi International Airport was the target of a Russian air strike, just a few hours before the scheduled arrival of French Foreign Minister Bernard Kouchner. Construction plant near to the airport was also bombed. According to Georgian authorities, three bombs had been dropped on the site that day. The Russian Ministry of Defence dismissed this report as "informational provocation" by Georgia. Georgian State Minister for Reintegration, Temur Iakobashvili later stated, "There was no attack on the airport in Tbilisi. It was a factory that produces combat airplanes."

A session of the United Nations Security Council was convened, in which UN Under-Secretary-General B. Lynn Pascoe gave a briefing about the refugee situation and Edmond Mulet briefed about the situation relating to the mandate of UNOMIG. Following statements by Georgia and the United States, the Russian ambassador said: "Unfortunately, I have to point out that the content of the briefing by Mr. Pascoe shows that the Secretariat and its leadership have not been able to adopt an objective position showing a thorough grasp of the substance of this conflict, as should be expected from the leadership of such an authoritative international organization." The Ambassador for the United States stated: "Foreign Minister Lavrov told United States Secretary of State Rice that the democratically elected President of Georgia — and I quote — 'must go'. I quote again: 'Saakashvili must go'. This is completely unacceptable and crosses the line." The Russian ambassador responded by saying, "On Ambassador Khalilzad’s interesting reference to a confidential diplomatic telephone call between our Minister for Foreign Affairs and his Secretary of State, I must say at the outset that regime change is an American expression. We do not use such expressions." After the meeting, CNN reported, "But Churkin drew a rebuke from other Security Council members, including its current president, after he questioned the objectivity of a top U.N. official who briefed ambassadors on the conflict in Georgia". Sergey Lavrov later claimed that Russian "peace enforcement" operation was not linked to the removal of Saakashvili from office. He said Condoleezza Rice "incorrectly interpreted" the phone conversation between them. He added if an agreement on non-use of military force is signed, "peace will be restored independently of the further fate of Saakashvili".

The Russian Defence Ministry announced that the Russian Navy sunk a Georgian missile boat after two alleged attacks of such boats earlier that day. This was later confirmed by Russian Navy Assistant Commander Igor Dygalo (by 11 August). He said that four Georgian vessels were spotted sailing inside a "declared security zone" established by the Russian Navy off Abkhazia. The Russian fleet retaliated with a barrage of artillery gunfire. One boat was sunk and the remaining three retreated in the direction of the Georgian port of Poti.

40 Russian transport aircraft landed at Sukhumi airport and delivered military equipment. In the evening of 10 August, more than 9,000 Russian troops and 350 armoured vehicles arrived at Sukhumi airport. Russian media later reported on 11 August that Russian Airborne Forces Commander Lieutenant General Valeriy Evtukhovich arrived in Abkhazia on 10 August.

According to Georgia, the total casualties due to the conflict were from 92 to 150. According to the BBC report, Georgian casualty figures were from 82 to about 130 killed, and this number included 37 civilians.

Around midnight, Russian and Georgian foreign ministers spoke over the phone. The conversation ended with the Georgian minister promising to find out more about the situation in South Ossetia.

A Turkish TV crew was attacked on 10 August while heading into South Ossetia and taken to Vladikavkaz for interrogations. Several days later, they were released by Russian authorities. Echo of Moscow reported that according to a journalist of Russian Newsweek magazine, South Ossetian separatists had killed two journalists.

August 11 

The Georgian representative, Shota Utiashvili, said that Russian artillery began intensive shelling of Gori. He also said that Gori had endured air strikes prior to this and that Georgian troops were returning fire on the Russian positions. The Russian Ministry of Defense did not confirm or deny the reports. Later, large numbers of Russian ground forces entered undisputed Georgian territory and were headed to Gori. Western officials again reiterated their fears that Russia intended to overthrow the Georgian government. Anatoly Nogovitsyn had said on early 11 August that his country's aim was not to "break into" undisputed Georgia. Artillery shelling of the Georgian villages near South Ossetia had been witnessed by a reporter for The New York Times. That day, even Abkhaz separatist government was concerned about possible Russian advance.

At 03:16 MSK, it was reported that Russians were not being allowed to leave Georgia. In the morning such reports were denied by the Georgian Ministry of Internal Affairs. Later, the Russian Ministry of Foreign Affairs claimed that it had received such reports from over 360 stranded Russian citizens.

After Georgian troops had left Tskhinvali on 10 August, the Russians indiscriminately bombed the civilian areas in Gori on 11 August by the afternoon and this was reported by The Guardian. Aerodrome near the Azerbaijani border and a radar station in Tbilisi were also bombed by Russia on the same day. About a dozen bombs detonated on the northern rim of the valley at about 12:30 pm. That day, reporters witnessed a skirmish near Tskhinvali after the ceasefire was offered by Georgia and bombing of civilians in Tkviavi by Russia.

Abkhaz defence minister Mirab Kishmaria threatened to kill all Georgian forces in the Kodori Gorge if they remained there. The Russian commander of the peacekeepers in Abkhazia, Major General Sergei Chaban, had given an ultimatum on 10 August to Georgian forces in the Zugdidi Municipality to disarm. Georgia declared it had received a Russian demand of disarming Georgian troops near Abkhazia through the U.N observers. In case of Georgian non-compliance, Russian troops would advance into undisputed Georgian territory.

South Ossetian government representative Irina Gagloeva [falsely] claimed in the morning that Georgia opened the irrigation canal, supposedly in an effort to flood the basements of Tskhinvali buildings with an intention to prevent civilians from hiding from bombings.

Russian President Medvedev said that Russian troops had "completed a significant part of the operations to oblige Georgia, the Georgian authorities, to restore peace to South Ossetia."

Deputy Chief of the General Staff of Russia, Colonel General Anatoliy Nogovitsyn, said the Georgian troops in South Ossetia were surrounded and surrendering. Nogovitsyn also said Russia was driving out all Georgian forces from Georgian villages, and that Russia was in full control of Georgian airspace. Nogovitsyn denied that Russa had bombed oil pipelines or civilian airport, but admitted bombing of a radar.

Bodyguards forced Georgian president Saakashvili to the ground in Gori when Russian planes flew over. Local civilians in Gori were warned that day by Georgian military of possible Russian advance; both civilians and military began abandoning Gori. Georgian official claimed that Gori was occupied by the Russian military. Georgian officials said that troops were ordered to defend Tbilisi, the capital of Georgia. Secretary of the Security Council, Alexander Lomaia, said that the Georgian Army was ordered to hold the city of Mtskheta,  from Tbilisi. At about 16:14 GMT, Reuters reported that its reporter in Gori had said that there was "no trace of troops or military vehicles, it is absolutely deserted". That day, The Daily Telegraph (UK) reported that it had witnessed "a full scale disorganised and panicked retreat from Gori". At 18:43 MSK, Lenta.ru reported that Nogovitsyn had stated that Russia would take "adequate measures" in response to that, which would mean the increase of Russian troops in conflict zone. Prime minister Vladimir Putin heavily criticised the United States for aiding in the redeployment of Georgian troops from Iraq.

At 17:18 MSK, Lenta.ru reported that Russian General Staff had confirmed during the briefing that Russian Army lost two Su-25 jets during the past few days. The total Russian losses were 4 jets, 18 killed soldiers and 14 missing soldiers.

At 18:07 MSK, Lenta.ru reported that Federal Security Service (FSB) Director Alexander Bortnikov had reported the arrest of nine Georgian special services agents allegedly organizing terrorist attacks on the territory of the Russian Federation. It was reported that all nine agents were confessing to the allegations.

Russian forces deployed in Abkhazia advanced into western Georgia. Russian troops occupied a road near Zugdidi and ordered reporters for The Daily Telegraph to leave the area. Artillery fire preceded Russian advance on Zugdidi. Russian troops captured the police stations in Zugdidi despite earlier Russian official claims of not intending to expand assault to Georgia proper. Russian troops captured the military base near the town of Senaki; they reportedly told the residents they would "annihilate" any Georgian soldier. Russian troops were barring any traffic from entering Senaki. According to The Telegraph, Senaki was "an important prize". UN officials B. Lynn Pascoe and Edmond Mulet said in a UN security meeting that Georgian Senaki base was taken without any resistance. Witnesses and Georgian officials reported that Abkhaz separatists had occupied the village of Kurga near Zugdidi.

At 19:09 MSK, Lenta.ru reported that North Ossetian government officials said that several pro-Georgian foreign mercenaries had arrived at Vladikavkaz hospital. Earlier at General Staff briefing, Anatoly Nogovitsyn had claimed that there were soldiers of black (African) descent with non-Georgian passports in the war zone, however their number and citizenship was not specified.

At about 20:21 MSK, the Assistant Commander of Russian peacekeepers Alexander Novitsky reported that during a reconnaissance mission the Russian Air Force had destroyed two Georgian helicopters at the air base of Senaki. The helicopters were identified as Mi-8 and Mi-24 belonging to the Georgian Air Force.

Georgian president had commented on the war, "This provocation was aimed at occupying South Ossetia, Abkhazia and then all of Georgia."

The Foreign Minister of Italy, Franco Frattini, said he would consider the possibility of deploying Italian troops to Georgia if French Foreign Minister Bernard Kouchner advised EU intervention, but Frattini added that the establishment of a "European anti-Russian coalition" would not by endorsed by Italy. He told ANSA that after phone talks with other G7 foreign ministers, he was "optimistic".

By 22:00, during the Georgian withdrawal to Mtskheta, a checkpoint on the highway was set up by the MIA Special Forces in Igoeti.

Russian troops left the Georgian military base at Senaki, which they had destroyed. Russians claimed that they left the Senaki base "after liquidating the danger." Russian Defence Ministry claimed that this raid intended to prevent "new attacks on South Ossetia". Senaki has a strategic location and its control would isolate the port of Poti. A Russian military ship was on patrol near Poti, reportedly imposing a  exclusion zone.

At 23:10 MSK, Lenta.ru reported that Russian Ministry of Defense, instead of denial, now confirmed sending of two companies of Chechnya-based special battalions Vostok ("East") and Zapad ("West") to South Ossetia.

Abkhaz Deputy Minister of Defense Garri Kupalba said on late 11 August that there were 2,500 Georgian troops in the Kodori gorge, but 1,000 civilians had fled the area through a humanitarian corridor, which had been opened for civilians and soldiers to get out safely before the operation to eliminate Georgian troops would begin.

Georgian and Russian officials said that Russian troops had appeared in Poti, though Russia claimed they had only sent in "a reconnaissance mission". The Georgian foreign ministry stated that more than 50 Russian planes had entered the Georgian airspace. The UN refugee agency had said that day that Russian attacks forced eighty percent of the 50,000 population to flee Gori.

August 12 
The United Nations Security Council held a closed meeting on the crisis at 5:30pm New York time on 11 August. Vitaly Churkin, Russian representative at the United Nations, declared to journalists on early 12 August that Russia would not accept the resolution prepared by France. The document had proposed an immediate cease-fire and restoring the territory of Georgia as it was before the beginning of the conflict. There were 5 UN Security Council meetings between 7 and 12 August.

The Agence France-Presse had reported that although the U.S. officials knew that "things were escalating" in early August, the Russian invasion and the timing was a surprise for them. US defense officials could not confirm the reports that Russian troops had occupied Gori. An anonymous official said, "We don't see anything that supports they are in Gori. I don't know why the Georgians are saying that."> Alexander Lomaia had told AFP: "The Russians are staying near Gori. They did not enter the city itself." President Saakashvili said that Georgians had killed several hundred Russian soldiers and downed 18 or 19 Russian planes.

The Guardian described the Russian invasion as "punitive campaign" aiming to impose "humiliating truce terms" on Georgia. Local journalist from Gori had reported that "Russian troops had occupied the main road on the edge of the city, but had not moved towards the centre". Georgian president stated that Russians had split Georgia into two by occupying an important crossroad near Gori. Georgian president told CNN, "The bombs that are falling on us, they have an inscription on them: This is for NATO. This is for the U.S." Georgia had retracted initial reports of Russian takeover of Gori. Georgian president accused Russia of ethnic cleansing of Georgians. BBC reported on 12 August that "Russia's control over many key bridges and roads across Georgia has left Tbilisi isolated from much of the country, causing visible panic."

The New York Times wrote, "By Tuesday morning, Georgian forces were in retreat. The road from Gori to Tbilisi was completely clear of Georgian forces, except for vehicles that had been abandoned." Russian planes had bombed the road to Tbilisi as the Georgian troops were retreating.

Abkhaz foreign minister Sergei Shamba announced that an offensive aimed at expelling Georgian troops from the Kodori Gorge was launched and claimed that Russian forces did not participate. Georgian Defense Ministry said that Abkhaz began their attack at 06:00 MSK. Anatoly Zaitsev, Abkhaz chief of the General Staff, stated that the Georgian troops in the Kodori Gorge were surrounded by the Abkhaz and that 250 Abkhaz troops had landed near Chkhalta, meeting resistance from Georgian units. 135 Russian military vehicles, including tanks, were witnessed by an Associated Press reporter in the afternoon as they were heading towards the Kodori Gorge.

Russian President Medvedev said on early 12 August that he had ordered an end to military operations in Georgia. Medvedev ordered Russian forces to fire on "hotbeds of resistance and other aggressive actions." However, Russian air raids did not stop in Georgia and Poti was bombed an hour after Medvedev's declaration. That day, Russian troops drove through Poti and took up positions around it. A bridge to the port of Batumi near Poti was patrolled by Russian paratroopers and armored vehicles.

After an end to hostilities was announced, Gori was shelled by the Russian artillery for the first time. A fragmentation shell exploded at a press center, which killed Dutch journalist and also damaged the neighboring buildings and lone open shop. The main square of the town, where a town hall and apartment buildings were situated, was also shelled. Six people were reportedly killed in the periphery of the town by shelling. A Dutch television, RTL, reported on the same day that Russian bombing had killed at least five people, including Dutch cameraman. Sky News Russia journalist reported that all the windows of the buildings were broken in the main square of Gori. Spokesman for Russian Foreign Ministry Boris Malakhov claimed that Russia had not attacked civilians. Later, Sky News was told by the acting Georgian ambassador to the UK that civilians targets were being bombed by Russia. The ambassador said that Russian accusation of Georgian "war crimes" was a smokescreen. Russian defence ministry denied the reports of non-cessation of hostilities and called them "provocations".

NATO ambassadors met only with the Georgian envoy, who had asked for military and political support, and supported Georgia. NATO said Georgia was still a candidate for NATO membership in spite of the conflict. Secretary General Jaap de Hoop Scheffer welcomed Medvedev's decision to stop hostilities, however this was "not enough". Georgian ambassador Revaz Beshidze said that NATO had earlier "made a big mistake" by denying membership plan to Georgia.

Abkhaz defense official said that Abkhaz troops had successfully carried out an operation to push Georgian forces out of the Kodori Gorge and reached the Georgian border. Although he claimed that Russians were not involved, Russian military traffic had been witnessed by an AP reporter. Abkhaz foreign minister, Sergei Shamba, said they had warned a U.N. observer mission in the gorge before the operation. Georgian president accused Abkhaz of ethnic cleansing. Russian General said that Abkhaz forces themselves expelled the Georgian troops from Abkhazia. Abkhaz fighters had accidentally killed one of their comrades during a military operation. The Abkhaz flag was flown over the former Georgian administrative building by midday. Only civilians found by the evening were two old women and four monks, since most civilians and Georgian military had fled. Abkhaz military said that a "mountain of weapons" was found. Herds of abandoned cattle were also found. Georgian refugees from the Kodori gorge said that they fled the shelling, which had damaged many houses.

Georgian President Mikheil Saakashvili said that Georgia would declare Russian peacekeepers as occupiers and the breakaway territories of Abkhazia and South Ossetia as occupied territory. Saakashvili announced at a large rally outside parliament that Georgia would leave the Commonwealth of Independent States. Georgia filed a lawsuit with the International Court of Justice, accusing Russia of carrying out ethnic cleansing between 1993 and 2008.

Associated Press reported that there was still sporadic fighting and artillery exchanges in Tskhinvali on 12 August. Georgian villages in South Ossetia were reportedly burned. BP announced that day it had shut down Baku-Supsa pipeline. The plane carrying the United Nations humanitarian aid arrived in Georgia that day.

French President Nicolas Sarkozy mediated a ceasefire plan between Russia and Georgia, which included provision to withdraw all troops to the lines they held before the war broke out. Russian president Medvedev had made 13 August a day of national mourning in Russia. After meeting Medvedev, French president Sarkozy told the news conference in Moscow that although a ceasefire had been agreed upon, a peace agreement was not yet reached by Russia and Georgia. Georgian Prime Minister Lado Gurgenidze said that although Georgian president Saakashvili had signed the four-point plan, Georgia would remain "prepared for everything" until Russia actually suspended hostilities.

August 13 
By 2 am, Medvedev and Saakashvili had agreed on a peace plan. Russian troops would have to withdraw to their "normal bases of encampment" meanwhile being able to "implement additional security measures." This agreement caused an American official to state later that such unclear meaning "would allow the Russians to do almost anything." French President Nicolas Sarkozy said at a press conference in Tbilisi that both Georgia and Russia accepted the peace plan.

Parts of Gori, a strategic central Georgian city, was occupied by a Russian tank battalion several hours after the ceasefire agreement. Talks of a possible Russian advance on Tbilisi began. The head of National Security Council of Georgia said that 50 Russian tanks had entered Gori.

Abkhaz de facto president Sergei Bagapsh arrived in the Kodori gorge by helicopter on the morning. He declared that the Abkhaz authorities had retaken last Abkhaz territory controlled by Georgia. Despite earlier Russian claims that the separatists themselves had expelled Georgian troops from the gorge, Anatoly Nogovitsyn said on 13 August that Georgian troops had been disarmed by Russian peacekeepers. Anatoly Nogovitsyn claimed that there still were sporadic clashes in South Ossetia.

Foreign Minister Sergey Lavrov said that Russian forces in Georgia continued their presence to support peacekeepers and Georgian troops had abandoned "a major arsenal of armaments and military equipment" that needed to be guarded. Russians would provide the residents of Gori with food, he said. General Vyacheslav Nikolayevich of the Pskov Airborne Division had claimed Russian troops would remain on the outskirts of Gori instead of entering the city.

A reporter for The Guardian said that "the idea there is a ceasefire is ridiculous", and that Chechen, Cossack and Ossetian irregulars were following advancing Russian military and burning Georgian villages near Gori. Anatoliy Nogovitsyn had claimed that Russians entered Gori only to negotiate with the local authorities, who were found to be absent, but there were no Russian tanks. Sky News correspondents confirmed that Russian tanks were in Gori. Sky News correspondents said that they were robbed at gunpoint, apparently by South Ossetian irregulars, and they had to return to Gori on foot. Norwegian journalists were also robbed in the centre of Gori that day.
The New York Times reported Czech journalists were robbed and that "almost completely empty" Gori was "firmly occupied". That day, The New York Times interviewed Russian commanders, who did not view their presence in Gori, the city where Joseph Stalin was born, as a violation of the ceasefire. One Russian soldier even said, "If [Saakashvili] does not understand the situation, we’ll have to go farther. It’s just 60 kilometers to Tbilisi." Another Russian officer confirmed attacks on Georgian villages. Human Rights Watch researchers reported that militias were responsible for "terrifying scenes of destruction" in ethnic Georgian villages. Anna Neistat said that Russian claims of systematic atrocities by Georgian military could not be supported by any evidence.

An Associated Press reporter witnessed the Russian tanks and military vehicles leaving Gori for Tbilisi, however the Russians stopped about an hour's drive from Tbilisi and encamped. Georgian troops occupied the road  closer to Tbilisi and began preparing a defense line. South Ossetian militias reportedly had begun looting in Gori.

Ukrainian President Viktor Yushchenko signed a decree requiring that Russian Black Sea Fleet should seek the permission of Ukrainian authorities at least 72 hours prior to any movements.

American president George W. Bush sent American troops on a humanitarian mission. This was hailed by Georgian president Saakashvili, which labelled the relief operation as a "turning point". Saakashvili assessed the American operation as a defence of Georgian ports and airports, however American officials denied this, with one senior official saying, "We won’t be protecting the airport or seaport, but we’ll certainly protect our assets if we need to." The first American C-17 Globemaster aircraft arrived in Tbilisi that day and brought humanitarian and medical supplies. Condoleezza Rice and George Bush accused Russia of continued presence in Georgia in violation of the ceasefire, however Russia claimed its actions complied with the ceasefire. After Bush had announced his support for Georgia, Georgian officials said that Russian began withdrawal from Gori. Russian official estimated that Gori would be returned to Georgians in two days. Saakashvili said, "We have been warning them a large scale Russian invasion is coming. (The) State Department told us the Russians are not going to do that."

Although journalists had reported that Russian military violated the ceasefire, Anatoly Nogovitsyn claimed on 13 August that it was Georgia in violation of ceasefire. According to Al Jazeera, "Russia's military on Wednesday repeatedly denied that any troops were inside Gori." Georgian president Saakashvili had accused Russia of "Balkan-type and World War II-type ethnic cleansing and purification campaigns". Russia said that "despite the assurances from the Georgian side that they have ended all military activities, Russian troops shot down a second Georgian drone over Tskhinvali earlier today." Georgia reported that 175 Georgians had died from the war.

August 14 
14 August had been announced as a day of mourning for the South Ossetian victims in Abkhazia.

It was reported on early 14 August that there was calm in Gori. At about 10:00, joint patrols of Georgian police and Russian forces in Gori was ordered by Russian major general while Russian troops were preparing to withdraw. Interfax reported at 12:10 MSK that the Russian army gave back control of Gori to the Georgian Police. The representative of the Russian Ministry of Defence, major-general Vyacheslav Borisov claimed that the rumours about damaged town and marauding did not correspond to reality. Secretary of National Defence Council of Georgia Alexander Lomaia, who was in Gori negotiating with the Russians, said on "Rustavi-2" TV on the live broadcast that the situation in Gori was calm and Russian army only did patrolling job.

At about 13:00, joint patrol efforts in Gori broke down due to apparent tensions among personnel. Although the Russian troops were ready for the handover of Gori, they postponed it. It was alleged that this happened due to Moscow assessing the U.S. humanitarian mission, which meant support for President Saakashvili. A stand-off took place near Gori between the Georgian police and the Russian forces with the Russian tanks arriving as reinforcements and the Georgians left the area. It was reported that near Gori five explosions took place. Russians reportedly had probably blown up a military depot near Gori. A BBC correspondent in Gori reported that day to have heard explosions. Georgian police allegedly reported that the refusal of the South Ossetians to leave Gori caused the Russian withdrawal to be canceled. Georgian official Alexander Lomaia was negotiating permission for the Georgian police to enter Gori. The Telegraph reported that "Meanwhile, South Ossetian irregulars continuing to loot and pillage in Gori and nearby Georgian villages, often with the encouragement of Russian troops". Anatoly Nogovitsyn claimed that day that Russia was not prepared for withdrawal from Gori, since Russian forces had to protect an abandoned ammunition.

Witnesses in Poti reported that Russian tanks had entered the town and were looting or destroying infrastructure. Russia denied that its troops were in Poti. Anatoly Nogovitsyn later said that Russians were gathering intelligence in Poti. It was reported that some of the troops occupying Zugdidi wore blue peacekeeping helmets while others wore green camouflage helmets.

President Medvedev met with South Ossetian and Abkhaz leaders in Moscow on 14 August. Georgian parliament decided to withdraw Georgia from the CIS. Human Rights Watch had only confirmed the death of 44 South Ossetian civilians and accused Russia of reporting false casualty figures. Two flights delivered the U.S. humanitarian aid on a C-17 military plane to Georgia.

U.S. Secretary of State Rice said that day "the provisional ceasefire that was agreed to really must go into place. And that means that military activities have to cease". Although Defence Secretary Gates accused the Russians of going "far beyond reasserting the autonomy of Abkhazia and South Ossetia," Gates nonetheless said that there was "no prospect" of US troops being deployed.

August 15 

Agence France-Presse reported that amid the ruins and tanks in the South Ossetian capital, the remaining residents shared insufficient goods and wondered why humanitarian aid promised by Russia had not arrived.

According to the report, 17 APCs and 200 soldiers marched towards Igoeti. The convoy included a military ambulance, snipers, rocket-propelled grenades and initially, three helicopters. The Georgian troops and police were nearby where the Russians had stopped, but did not resist them. According to the International Herald Tribune (IHT), the move "opened a new security vacuum between Gori and [Igoeti], creating fresh targets" for "looters and armed gangs in uniform - many of them apparently Ossetians, Chechens and Cossacks - [who] have operated behind the army's path, ransacking villages largely vacated by fleeing civilians."

After about five-hour meeting with Condoleezza Rice, President Saakashvili signed an EU-brokered ceasefire. Rice in Tbilisi declared: "Russian forces need to leave Georgia at once. This is no longer 1968." Saakashvili described Russians as "21st century barbarians". He blamed the West for provoking the conflict by not properly reacting to Russia's previous military acts and not allowing Georgia to become a NATO member as soon as possible. The Russian General Staff said at its daily news briefing on the same day that no shooting occurred in the previous 24 hours. Russian ground troops were mostly based around Gori.

German Chancellor Angela Merkel met Russian president Dmitry Medvedev in Sochi. Medvedev said in Sochi that he couldn't see the people of South Ossetia and Abkhazia wishing to be still a part of Georgia and claimed not Russia, but local residents opposed international peacekeeping forces in the two regions.

Amidst what the Associated Press described as "intense diplomacy" to pressure Russia to withdraw from Georgia, Interfax News Agency quoted Russian General Anatoly Nogovitsyn as saying that Poland "is exposing itself to a strike" by welcoming an American missile battery. Associated Press reported that Gori "is key to when – or if – Russia will honour the terms of a ceasefire". Despite earlier reports of Russian troops moving towards Kutaisi, Georgian official denied the Russian presence in Kutaisi.

Human Rights Watch stated they had documented the use of cluster bombs against Georgian civilians by Russian Air Force and urged Russia not to use such banned weapons. The accusation was dismissed by the Russian Defence Ministry and one Russian official claimed that the HRW used "biased witnesses" as source of information.

August 16 

The BBC reported that the Russian army entered the port of Poti on 16 August "at least the third time" since the war began. The Russian forces that were occupying Poti, as well as military bases in Gori and Senaki, that day destroyed the military bases which were based on the NATO standard and the American-made or supplied arsenal.

Early on 16 August, foxholes were dug up by the Russians in Igoeti. In the afternoon, the Russian forces withdrew from their positions in Igoeti. The Russian withdrawal from Igoeti was reported by the western news agencies. The IHT noted that Russian soldiers still were in Zugdidi and Senaki in western Georgia, and that Russian armored patrol was on the road to Abasha near Kutaisi. In Poti, 16 coastal guard vessels were confiscated by the Russian military. The major Georgian east-west highway was controlled by the Russian forces by occupying the positions around Gori and the city of Senaki.

The Georgian Foreign Ministry announced that Russian troops destroyed a major railway bridge in the Kaspi district responsible for bisecting Georgia from east to west and linking the hinterland to seaports on the Black Sea. Russians denied blowing up the bridge. However, the destruction of the bridge caused Azerbaijan to halt oil shipments and Armenian supply of goods was also interrupted.

Dmitry Medvedev told the permanent members of the Security Council that he had signed the ceasefire document on 12 August in Moscow.

The Guardian reported that South Ossetian forces had occupied undefended Akhalgori on 16 August and that one South Ossetian fighter said,"It will be part of an independent country within the Russian Federation." It was reported that new checkpoints were set up by the Russian forces on the Tbilisi-Gori road and that a Grad multiple-rocket launcher was moving towards Tbilisi.

Georgian Foreign Ministry stated that Russian forces and Abkhaz separatists had taken 13 villages and the Inguri hydropowerpower plant. After this action, the border of Abkhazia was shifted toward the Inguri River.

August 17 

Richard Galpin of the BBC, who had spent the past two days travelling from Poti to Tbilisi, reported that Georgian forces "seemed to be surrendering control of the highway to the Russians". According to BBC's Gabriel Gatehouse, there was a "much-reduced" Russian military presence in Gori that day and humanitarian aid was being delivered, however Russians still controlled major entry and exit points of Gori. The Russian commander claimed that his troops remained in Gori to avoid looting and would only leave after the Georgian police was ready. Major General Vyacheslav Borisov claimed that day to have ordered Russian peacekeepers to replace Russian soldiers in Igoeti, but this was disputed by Georgia. The Times reported that Russia was occupying about a third of Georgia and that Ossetian militiamen were wearing white armbands to ease their recognition for Russians.

Russian president Medvedev promised Sarkozy that Russian troops would begin withdrawal to South Ossetia on 18 August. Georgian president Saakashvili said that "Georgia will never give up a square kilometer of its territory." Earlier, the residents of Zugdidi had protested against the Russian occupation.

The New York Times reported that Russia had deployed SS-21 Scarab missile launchers to South Ossetia on 15 August.

August 18 
Anatoly Nogovitsyn from the Russian General Staff said around noon that Russia had started to pull troops from Georgia.

RIA Novosti reported that Russian military equipment was being pulled out of the South Ossetian capital Tskinvali.

Four Russian armored vehicles in the village of Igoeti appeared to be moving to the village of Lamiskana, however they were resisted by Georgian police, which had made a barrier with their vehicles. The Russian general ordered his soldiers to drive over the police cars, however the Georgian policemen managed to get out of the cars before the Russians drove over their cars.

Late on afternoon, Russian military units were still holding the center of Georgia and Russian military convoys were moving in and out of Gori. In western Georgia, there was no signs of a Russian withdrawal from Zugdidi by mid-afternoon, but a convoy of 12 Russian military vehicles had rolled south toward the port of Poti in the morning. Russian troops were still occupying an air base and other positions in Senaki.

However, Russian forces actually had never crossed into Georgia proper before the war.

August 19 

The Wall Street Journal said Russian forces had seized control of Poti on the morning, which is the economically significant port. Georgian soldiers in Poti were captured by the Russian forces and taken to the base in Senaki four hours later. The Russians also captured five American jeeps. Later, American Humvees moved down the road to Abkhazia. A top Russian military official claimed that armed Georgian soldiers in Poti were driving the Humvees and were detained at a checkpoint, however the Georgians said that 21 Georgian soldiers were guarding the port from looting, and that American Humvees used in a joint exercise were packed in a container to be shipped back to the United States. An Azerbaijani news source quoted a Poti port official as saying, "All workers were expelled from the port [yesterday at night]".

Prisoners of war were exchanged by Russia and Georgia. A Georgian official said that although his country exchanged five Russian servicemen for fifteen Georgians (including two civilians), Georgia suspected that Russia still held two more Georgians. The exchange took place in Igoeti and two of the exchanged Russians were pilots. Earlier, Russia had claimed that Russian troops were pulling back while Georgia was not complying with the ceasefire.

NATO countries convened for an emergency summit in Brussels to find some consensuses on a response towards Russia in regard to the conflict in Georgia. Russian Foreign Minister Sergei Lavrov levelled accusations at NATO of being "unobjective and biased" in maintaining support for a "criminal regime" that was "failing." Russian president Medvedev had told French president Sarkozy that the withdrawal would be complete by 21–22 August, however 500 Russian soldiers would guard South Ossetian border.

The New York Times reported that Russian troops were patrolling villages in western Georgia with tanks and armored personnel carriers daily. Russians had deployed artillery along major roads between Poti and Abkhazia. Reinforced trenches for a Russian checkpoint north of Gori was being built by engineering platoon and Russian armored vehicles were overlooking Gori and Igoeti from high ground. Most of the conflict zone was reportedly in need of water and food. Georgian villagers were hiding in fear of looters.

Interfax reported that the head of Russian Federal Security Service said that according to intelligence reports, Georgia planned terrorist attacks in southern Russia, and security was increased at transportation hubs, industrial plants and densely populated areas. Martin Nesirky, a spokesman for the OSCE, said that OSCE would deploy 20 international monitors in addition to 8 already present in South Ossetia, who would begin arriving on 21 August and be let in the area adjacent to South Ossetia.

August 20 

The United Nations Security Council met at 16:15 EDT on 19 August to hear briefings about the situation, including brief statements of Lynn Pascoe about human rights abuses and relief shipments to the conflict area, and the promise of a permanent Russian military base in South Ossetia. The Georgian ambassador reported cases of destruction of their civilian and military infrastructure and reported a cyber attack from Russia. The Russian ambassador accused other parties of engaging in "propaganda".

On 20 August, a French-drafted UN Security Council resolution was not passed because of Russian resistance and Vitaly Churkin said, "It's a waste of time because the process of the withdrawal of Russian forces will continue." A claim was made by an official from the Poti port that the Russian military had withdrawn after blowing up a vessel and capturing military equipment.

Russia reduced initial civilian casualty figures of 1,600 people for the conflict to 133 ethnic Ossetian civilians listed as dead. Russia also reduced the number of its killed military to 64, but increased the number of its wounded military to more than 300. Georgia said that 160 Georgian soldiers were killed and 300 were missing. International Criminal Court stated that it was analysing the conflict.

August 21 

Russia's emergencies ministry declared in a statement, "A total of 17,912 people returned in the period August 12–20."

Russian forces still continued to occupy Gori and Igoeti. Russian Defense Minister Anatoly Serdyukov repeated Medvedev's claim that Russian troops would withdraw to South Ossetia by the end of 22 August. Commander of Russian land forces, General Vladimir Boldyrev, claimed that withdrawal of troops not manning the security zones to Russia would last for 10 days. Near Poti, an AP photographer and TV crew were detained by the Russian soldiers and their equipment was confiscated. The residents of Poti protested against the Russian occupation. Associated Press reported that "tanks, armored personnel carriers and trucks were seen moving in both directions on the road from Gori to Tskhinvali." There were reports of Georgian villages being looted and burned. Conductor Valery Gergiev held the concert during the night in front of the South Ossetian parliament in Tskhinvali.

American President George Bush told Georgian President Saakashvili during their phone conversation that the United States sought to end the Russian "siege" of Georgia.

August 22 

Russian forces withdrew from Igoeti, and Georgian police advanced towards Gori. Colonel-general Nogovitsyn demonstrated to reporters the map of the "zone of responsibility" that would be established in Georgia after the military withdrawal. Novogitsyn commented on the Russian military presence on parts of the highway around Gori by saying that "if needed we reserve the right to boost these forces with units from the Russian peacekeepers’ contingent".

Russia had withdrawn most troops from Georgia by the evening to Abkhazia and South Ossetia and Georgia's main east-west highway was effectively reopened. The New York Times reported: "The Russian incursion into Georgia had already energized the world’s corps of military attachés, who have been provided a rare chance to see the Russian Army operating in the field. [...] And many Russian troops, after several years of emphasis by former President Vladimir V. Putin on developing units of volunteers and not conscripts, looked fit and alert."

Russia claimed that its promised troop pullout from Georgia was complete and announced that Russia would permanently maintain a large buffer zone near South Ossetia and Abkhazia. According to a White House spokesman, American President Bush and French President Sarkozy had agreed that Russia was not in compliance with the ceasefire. The Kremlin, however, said in a formal announcement on 23 August, that President Sarkozy, in a telephone conversation with Russian President Medvedev, had shown satisfaction with the Russian withdrawal.

August 23 
Units of the Georgian Army returned to Gori. Russian military was pulling out from Zugdidi to Abkhazia. Russian troops left the military base in Senaki after looting it for more than a week. However, Russian checkpoints remained near Gori as well as in so-called buffer zones near the borders with Abkhazia and South Ossetia, and two Russian observer posts remained near Poti. At a news conference General Anatoly Nogovitsyn insisted, "These patrols were envisaged in the international agreement. Poti is outside of the security zone, but that does not mean we will sit behind a fence watching them riding around in Hummers." Nogovitsyn claimed that Georgia was rearming for "another act of aggression". He claimed that "2,100 people" were killed in the conflict.

August 24 

With Russian forces still within the port of Poti, a US warship arrived with aid supplies in Batumi and two more warships were expected to arrive. The supplies delivered by the destroyer USS McFaul would be unloaded by a floating crane since the warship did not fit into the port. The BBC reported that "apart from delivering aid, the arrival of US naval personnel is undoubtedly intended to send a signal to the Russians - that America is serious about its support for Georgia." Georgia stated that day that a fuel train exploded near Gori.

August 25 

The Deputy Defense Minister of Abkhazia, Anatoly Zaitsev, claimed that 8,000 Georgian troops were massing at the border with Abkhazia.

Abkhaz and South Ossetian leaders addressed the Russian Parliament before the vote at extraordinary sittings, which had been formally convened by separatist appeals. Both houses of the Russian Parliament passed unanimous non-binding resolutions calling on Russian President Medvedev to recognise the independence of Abkhazia and South Ossetia. The US state department said that such action would be "a violation of Georgian territorial integrity" and "inconsistent with international law". American president Bush said, "I call on Russia's leadership to meet its commitments and not recognise these separatist regions." German, British and Italian leaders were also concerned.

August 26 

Russian President Medvedev signed two Presidential decrees recognizing the Republic of Abkhazia and the Republic of South Ossetia as sovereign independent states. He authorized the drafting of treaties of friendship, cooperation and mutual assistance with authorities in Sukhumi and Tskhinvali.

References

External links
 Timeline of Georgian Ministry of Foreign Affairs
 Globalsecurity's timeline of the conflict
 BBC's coverage of the conflict
 Qartu.com's timeline of the conflict. Archived on August 31, 2008

Russo-Georgian War
Russo-Georgian War